Rafael Lomana (born September 5, 1965) is a Spanish politician and former professional skier and television presenter.

Biography
Lomana was born in 1965 in Santander and grew up in León. He is the younger brother of media personality Carmen Lomana. He began practicing extreme sports at a young age and became a skiing instructor at the Sierra Nevada.

Media career
Lomana worked as a presenter on a number of sports channels, including Extreme Challenge with mountaineer Jesús Calleja in 2010 and Be The Best on Be Mad TV since 2016.

Politics
In March 2019, Lomama announced he had joined the Vox with the intention of running as a candidate in the next general election.  In the April 2019 elections he was elected to the Congress of Deputies for Vox representing the Albacete constituency.

References 

1965 births
Living people
Members of the 13th Congress of Deputies (Spain)
Members of the 14th Congress of Deputies (Spain)
Vox (political party) politicians
Spanish media personalities
Spanish athletes
Spanish television presenters